East Perth Eagles is an NBL1 West club based in Perth, Western Australia. The club fields a team in both the Men's and Women's NBL1 West. The club is a division of East Perth District Basketball Association (EPDBA), the major administrative basketball organisation in Perth's north eastern suburbs. The Eagles play their home games at Herb Graham Recreation Centre.

Club history

Background
Basketball in East Perth began in 1946 with the formation of the Western Australian Basketball Association. As a founding member of the association, the organisation was originally known as the Youth Catholic Workers (YCW) Highgate Basketball Club. In 1948, they were renamed Highgate Basketball Club. Premiership success eluded Highgate for the first ten years, but in the years afterwards, a total of 35 premierships were won at various levels of Western Australian basketball.

In 1956, along with YMCA (Perth), Highgate was a founding member of the Women's Division of the Western Australian Basketball Association.

In 1972, Highgate Basketball Club was given the task of combining all local basketball clubs in the East Perth Football Club's broad catchment area to form a 'District' Club. The organisation was subsequently renamed North Eastern Suburbs Basketball Association (NESBA), but later changed the name in 1975 to East Perth District Basketball Association (EPDBA) to more accurately reflect the organisation's origins and the area represented.

In the women's District Competition, EPDBA won four consecutive championships between 1977 and 1980. The women's team contested six consecutive grand finals between 1976 and 1981 and fell short of winning their fifth consecutive title by only four points. Meanwhile, the men's team won three District titles in 1980, 1983 and 1988.

SBL / NBL1 West

Two decades of on-court struggle (1989–2009)
1989 saw the formation of the State Basketball League (SBL) with both a men's and women's competition. East Perth, trading as the Eagles, entered a team into both the Men's SBL and Women's SBL. In the inaugural SBL season, both teams played finals basketball with the men finishing in sixth place with a 12–10 record, while the women finished in fourth place with a 14–7 record. The turn of the decade brought dismal records for the Eagles. Between 1990 and 1999, the women's team failed to set a winning season, finishing under .500 every year. During this time, they went 0–20 in 1993 and 0–24 in 1998, and even sat out the 1996 season. The men's team did not fair much better, as they set a winning record just once during the 1990s — a 13–11 season in 1998. Things got even worse for the club in the early 2000s, with both the men and women recording losing seasons every year between 2000 and 2009. With the conclusion of the 2009 season, the men had amassed an overall record of 150 wins and 362 losses (.293 winning percentage), while the women had amassed 78 wins and 356 losses (.180 winning percentage).

Building towards a championship (2010–2014)
The 2010 season saw both teams set winning records, with the women having their best season since 1989 with a fifth-place finish and a 14–8 record, while the men had their best season since 1998 with an eighth-place finish and a 13–13 record.

In 2011, the women improved to third place with a club-best 16–6 record, after winning their last nine games of the regular season, before advancing through to their first ever WSBL Grand Final. In the championship decider on 26 August at the WA Basketball Centre, the Eagles were narrowly defeated 72–71 by the Willetton Tigers.

Season 2012 saw the rise of the men's team, as they finished in fourth place with a team-best 16–10 record and went on to reach their first ever MSBL Grand Final. In the championship decider on 1 September at the WA Basketball Centre, the Eagles were defeated 105–72 by the Cockburn Cougars. It was the largest losing margin in grand final history.

Following a semi-final defeat in 2013, the Eagles returned to the MSBL Grand Final in 2014 behind a line-up of captain Drew Williamson, Tom Jervis, Sunday Dech, Kyle Armour, Joe-Alan Tupaea and Mathiang Muo. Despite finishing in seventh place with a 14–12 record, the Eagles went on to defeat the Rockingham Flames 2–1 in the quarter-finals before sweeping the Perth Redbacks in the semi-finals. In the championship decider on 30 August, the Eagles won their maiden championship with a 99–83 victory over the Geraldton Buccaneers, with Tupaea earning Grand Final MVP for his 12 points, 12 rebounds and seven assists.

NBL1 West (2021–present)
In 2021, the SBL was rebranded as NBL1 West.

Accolades
Women
Championships: Nil
Grand Final appearances: 1 (2011)
Minor premierships: Nil

Men
Championships: 1 (2014)
Grand Final appearances: 2 (2012, 2014)
Minor premierships: Nil

References

External links
EPDBA's official website

Basketball teams in Western Australia
NBL1 West teams
Basketball teams established in 1989
1989 establishments in Australia